Bai Baoshan (November 6, 1958 – April 1998) was a Chinese serial killer who killed 15 people.

Life 
Bai Baoshan committed his first crime in 1983, serving 13 years of a 15-year sentence in prison for robbery and assault. After being released on March 7, 1996, he sought revenge on authorities, and on 31 March 1996, he attacked the guard at a power station in Beijing. Using a semi-automatic firearm previously stolen from a police officer, Bai injured two civilians and four others badly. The police suspected him of robbing and murdering a cigarette dealer. In Hebei Province, he raided a military base, killing a soldier and taking his automatic rifle with him. Bai later robbed and killed a cigarette dealer and injured three others near Deshengmen in Beijing in December 1996. In Ürümqi, together with another accomplice Wu Ziming, he killed a total of ten more people, including 2 policemen, and stole 1.4 million renminbi. When there was a dispute over the spoils, he shot Wu at Tianchi on 26 August 1997.

On 5 September 1997, Bai was arrested at his home in Beijing. Since he had committed most of his actions in the Xinjiang region, he was transferred there on 3 December 1997 and charged with, among other things, 14 charges of murder. After being convicted on all counts and sentenced to death, he was executed in April 1998 in Xinjiang by shooting.

See also 
 List of serial killers by country

References

Literature 
 Murakami, Peter and Julia: Encyclopedia of serial killers: 450 case studies of a pathological killing type. 7th edition, Ullstein paperback, Munich 2001, . (Source, unless stated otherwise.)

Notes 

1958 births
1998 deaths
20th-century executions by China
Chinese people convicted of murder
Executed Chinese serial killers
Executed people from Hebei
Male serial killers
People executed by China by firearm
People executed for murder